Kunar may refer to:

Kunar, Budaun, is a village in India
Künar, Kale
Kunar Hembram, is an Indian politician
Kunar snowtrout, is a species of ray-finned fish
Kunar Valley, Afghanistan and Pakistan
Kunar Province, Afghanistan
Islamic Emirate of Kunar, today Afghanistan 
Kunar River, Afghanistan and Pakistan
Raid on Kunar, was a NATO operation
Ghaziabad, Kunar, is a District in Kunar Province, in eastern Afghanistan
Bar Kunar District, is a district in Kunar Province, Afghanistan
Kuz Kunar District, is a district in the north of Nangarhar Province, Afghanistan
Kunar Cricket Ground, is a cricket ground in Asadabad
Khas Kunar District, is the largest district in the Kunar Province, Afghanistan